A culet (also spelled culette) is a piece of plate armour consisting of small, horizontal lames that protect the small of the back or the buttocks. Usually a skirt of chain mail or a mail brayette was worn underneath.

This armour was also referred to as a garde de rein or garde rein, or hoguine.

References 

Western plate armour